"Carrie" is a power ballad by the Swedish rock band Europe released in 1987. It was the third single released internationally from the album The Final Countdown, and it is their highest-charting song on the Billboard Hot 100 chart—peaking at #3 (#1 on the Radio and Records chart) during the fall of 1987.  It also reached #36 on the Billboard Adult Contemporary chart. The track on the B-side of the 7" single was "Love Chaser".

The song was written by Joey Tempest and Mic Michaeli in 1985. An early version of the song that consisted of just keyboards and vocals, was played on a tour in Sweden the same year. The demo version was similar, but the final version that was included on the album The Final Countdown included the whole band playing.

On Europe tours following the band's reunion in 2003, an acoustic version of "Carrie" has been played, with Tempest performing the song on an acoustic guitar. In recent years, however, the band has switched back to the arrangement of the album version. A performance of the acoustic version can be found on the Live from the Dark DVD and a performance of the album version can be found on the Live at Shepherd's Bush, London DVD.

Personnel
Joey Tempest − vocals
John Norum − guitar
John Levén − bass 
Mic Michaeli − keyboard
Ian Haugland − drums

Chart positions

References

1986 songs
1987 singles
1980s ballads
Glam metal ballads
Europe (band) songs
Epic Records singles
Songs written by Joey Tempest
Songs written by Mic Michaeli